Badger Mountain is a mountain in Douglas County in the U.S. state of Washington. It is the highest point in Douglas County and is located east of the Columbia River and northeast of Wenatchee. Badger Mountain is part of the Columbia Plateau.

The Badger Mountain Ski Area is located on the mountain's northeastern flank.

According to Edmond S. Meany, a Mt. St. Pierre named by Lt. Johnson of the United States Exploring Expedition in 1841 was probably Badger Mountain. Its present name goes back to settlers and refers to the native animal, the badger.

References

Sources

External links
 
 

Mountains of Douglas County, Washington
Mountains of Washington (state)